Geranyl-diphosphate diphosphohydrolase may refer to:
 Geranylgeranyl diphosphate diphosphatase, an enzyme
 Geranyl diphosphate diphosphatase, an enzyme